The 31st General Assembly of Prince Edward Island was in session from March 27, 1890, to November 13, 1893. The Liberal Party led by Frederick Peters formed a government after the Conservatives lost their majority in the 1890 election.

There were four sessions of the 31st General Assembly:

Patrick Blake was elected speaker in 1890; after Blake resigned his seat in 1891, Bernard D. McLellan was chosen as speaker.

Members

Notes:

External links 
  Election results for the Prince Edward Island Legislative Assembly, 1890-01-30
 Prince Edward Island, garden province of Canada, WH Crosskill (1904)

Terms of the General Assembly of Prince Edward Island
1890 establishments in Prince Edward Island
1893 disestablishments in Prince Edward Island